Khurais Airport (old) is a small airport near the oil complex of Khurais in the Eastern Province of Saudi Arabia. The airport occupies a small area of 0.28 km2 south of the new complex.

Overview
Saudi Aramco, the national oil company of Saudi Arabia, owns and used to operate the airport providing logistic support to the remote oil complex. However airport has been abandoned for a long time since the old complex was demolished and a new airport (Khurais Airport) was built next to the newly established complex as part of the Khurais Project

Facilities
The airport has poor infrastructure as it is equipped with one old runway, 1,870 meters long and 30 meters wide without taxiways or terminals. A small area of 2,200 m2 can be found between the runway and the entrance of the airfield for aircraft parking/movement.

References

External links
 https://skyvector.com/airport/OEKR/Khurais-Airport

Khurais oil field
Airports in Saudi Arabia